Freeman Tulley Knowles (October 10, 1846 – June 1, 1910) was a veteran of the American Civil War, lawyer, journalist and social activist. From 1897 to 1899, he served one term in the United States House of Representatives as a Populist.

Biography
Knowles was born in Harmony, Maine, and educated at the local schools and Bloomfield Academy in Skowhegan.

Civil War 
He enlisted for the American Civil War in 1862, joining the 16th Maine Volunteer Infantry Regiment.  He served until the end of the war, took part in several battles including the Battle of Gettysburg, and attained the rank of Corporal.

Career 
After the war Knowles moved to Denison, Iowa, where he studied law and attained admission to the bar.  He practiced in Denison from 1869 until 1886, when he moved to Nebraska to become publisher of the Ceresco Times.

Knowles moved to Tilford, South Dakota in 1888 to begin publication of the Meade County Times.  He subsequently moved to Deadwood to publish the Evening Independent.

Congress 
In addition to his activities in journalism, Knowles became active in the Populist Party.  After running unsuccessfully for Seat A in 1894, in 1896 he was elected to Seat B, one of South Dakota's two at-large seats in the United States House of Representatives.  He served in the 55th United States Congress, March 4, 1897 to March 3, 1899, and was an unsuccessful candidate for reelection in 1898.

Later career 
Knowles later became involved with the Socialist Party of America, and made unsuccessful runs for Governor of South Dakota in 1904 and 1906.  In addition, he started a socialist newspaper, The Lantern, and his editorials and stories on topics including birth control, labor rights, and labor unions angered mine owners and other business leaders, which resulted in scrutiny by law enforcement agencies and other government officials.  In 1908 he was charged with sending obscene material through the mails, and sentenced to a year in prison.

Death and burial 
Knowles died in Deadwood, South Dakota on June 1, 1910.  He was buried at Mount Moriah Cemetery in Deadwood.

References

External links

1846 births
1910 deaths
People from Harmony, Maine
People's Party members of the United States House of Representatives from South Dakota
South Dakota Populists
People from Denison, Iowa
People from Deadwood, South Dakota
Union Army soldiers
Iowa lawyers
19th-century American journalists
American male journalists
Burials in South Dakota
Socialist Party of America politicians from South Dakota
19th-century American male writers
19th-century American politicians
19th-century American lawyers
Members of the United States House of Representatives from South Dakota